Professor Ann McNeill is a British academic and tobacco policy expert. She is currently a professor of Tobacco Addiction in the National Addictions Centre at the King's College London Institute of Psychiatry and deputy director of the UK Centre for Tobacco Control Studies.

McNeill has devoted her career to reducing the harmfulness of smoking to individuals and society and has worked in prevention, cessation and harm reduction, in particular how to reduce the health inequalities caused by smoking. McNeill is a Council member of Action on Smoking and Health and is a trustee of the Society for the Study of Addiction and of Tobacco Free Futures.

Academic career
Having graduated from the University of Nottingham with a 1st class joint honours degree in Psychology and Zoology, McNeill began her career in addictions research with a PhD in the development of dependence in adolescent smokers at the University of London. 
McNeill then worked in a quasi-governmental agency and as a freelance consultant whilst holding honorary academic positions at St George's Hospital Medical School and University College London. In 2005, she was appointed Professor of Health and Policy Promotion in the Division of Epidemiology and Public Health at the University of Nottingham.

McNeill is currently the Professor of Tobacco Addiction in the National Addictions Centre at the King's College London Institute of Psychiatry and deputy director for tobacco of the UK Centre for Tobacco Control Studies.

Having published extensively in the field of smoking and tobacco control, McNeill has authored over 250 publications including original research, editorials and commentaries; she has co-authored books, and acted as editor or guest editor on journal supplements. McNeill is a senior editor of the journal Addiction.

She is the lead author of a 2015 report E - cigarettes: an Evidence Update commissioned by Public Health England. Among many other things, this concluded that e-cigarettes are around 95% less harmful than smoking.

Policy influence

McNeill has worked to develop and evaluate tobacco control policy for a number of years, and has chaired a number of policy groups including the World Health Organization Europe Partnership Project Group to Reduce Tobacco Dependence (1999 - 2001) and the World Health Organization Scientific Advisory Committee on Tobacco Product Regulation (2000 - 2002). McNeill was also the Scientific Coordinator for the Analysis of the Science and Policy in Europe for the Control of Tobacco European Commission Project (2004 - 2006).

McNeill has been a member of the Royal College of Physicians Tobacco Advisory Group since 1998 and was recently a member of the National Institute of Health and Clinical Excellence: Harm Reduction Programme Development Group. She is currently the chair for the Reference Group for the Independent Evaluation of the Responsibility Deal and Principal Investigator for the UK arm of the International Tobacco Control Policy Evaluation Project. 
McNeill has acted as Management Advisor of the SRNT/UICC Tobacco Treatment Database since its inception .

Honours and awards
In 1998 McNeill was awarded the World Health Organization World No Tobacco Day Tobacco Control medal.

In 2019 McNeill was recognised as key leading female figure and role model in the addictions field, discussing her life and influences in a short film made about her for the Society for the Study of Addiction.

References

Academics of King's College London
NIHR Senior Investigators
Living people
Tobacco
Year of birth missing (living people)
Alumni of the University of Nottingham
Alumni of the University of London
Place of birth missing (living people)